The following is the 1962–63 network television schedule for the three major English language commercial broadcast networks in the United States. The schedule covers primetime hours from September 1962 through August 1963. The schedule is followed by a list per network of returning series, new series, and series cancelled after the 1961–62 season.

Summary
Television historians Harry Castleman and Walter Podrazik (1982) state, "Despite all the promises of programming reform made by television executives in May, 1961" (the month of Newton Minow's landmark speech "Television and the Public Interest"), "the 1962–63 schedule turned out to be business as usual". Castleman and Podrazik point out that although the three networks had added generally well-made public-affairs and news programs to their schedules, there were "too many of them and their sheer number diluted the audience and stretched resources far too thin to allow quality productions each week". CBS aired CBS Reports and Eyewitness, NBC broadcast Chet Huntley Reporting, David Brinkley's Journal and Actuality Specials, while ABC had Bell and Howell Close-up and the Howard K. Smith show. Despite Minow's complaints that the sitcoms of the era were "totally unrealistic" and his disdain for cartoons, the new sitcoms of 1962 were even more hostile to Minow's stated taste and were frequently "stretching further than ever for their situations"; increasingly fantastical premises such as hillbillies in the city (The Beverly Hillbillies) and cartoons set a century into the future (The Jetsons, ABC's first regularly-scheduled TV series to air in color) were among the new offerings.

This was the first season that ABC aired some of their prime-time programs in color.

Schedule 
New fall series are highlighted in bold. All times are Eastern and Pacific.

Each of the 30 highest-rated shows is listed with its rank and rating as determined by Nielsen Media Research.

 Yellow indicates the programs in the top 10 for the season.
 Cyan indicates the programs in the top 20 for the season.
 Magenta indicates the programs in the top 30 for the season.

Sunday 

* formerly known as General Electric Theater
* McKeever and the Colonel aired Sundays at 6:30-7 on NBC.
* The Bullwinkle Show aired Sundays at 5:30-6 on NBC.
* Password aired Sundays at 6:30-7 on CBS.

Monday 

* In some areas, Walter Cronkite with the News and The Huntley-Brinkley Report aired at 6:45 p.m.(ET). Stump the Stars was formerly Pantomime Quiz.

Tuesday 

Note: The CBS series Marshal Dillon consisted of reruns of episodes of Gunsmoke.

Wednesday

Thursday

Friday

Saturday 

 Formerly known as Matty's Funnies with Beany and Cecil.

By network

ABC

Returning Series
77 Sunset Strip
ABC News Reports
The Adventures of Ozzie and Harriet
Alcoa PremiereThe AvengersBeany and Cecil *Bell and Howell CloseupBen CaseyCheyenneThe Donna Reed ShowThe Fight of the Week
The Flintstones
Hawaiian Eye
Hollywood Special
Howard K. Smith: News and Comment
The Lawrence Welk Show
Leave It to Beaver
Make That Spare
My Three Sons
Naked City
The Rifleman
The Untouchables
The Voice of Firestone
Wagon Train (moved from NBC)

New Series
Combat!
The Dakotas *
The Gallant Men
Going My Way
Hootenanny *
I'm Dickens, He's Fenster
The Jetsons
McHale's Navy
Mr. Smith Goes to Washington
Our Man Higgins
The Roy Rogers and Dale Evans Show
Stoney Burke

Not returning from 1961–62:
Adventures in Paradise
Bachelor Father
Bronco
The Bugs Bunny Show
Bus Stop
Calvin and the Colonel
The Detectives Starring Robert Taylor
Expedition!
The Hathaways
The Law and Mr. Jones
Lawman
Margie
Matty's Funday Funnies
The New Breed
The Roaring 20's
Room for One More
The Steve Allen Show
Straightaway
Surfside 6
Target: The Corruptors!
Top Cat
Yours for a Song

CBS

Returning Series
The Alfred Hitchcock Hour (moved from NBC)
The Andy Griffith Show
Armstrong Circle Theatre
Brenner
CBS News Hour
CBS Reports
Candid Camera
Danny Thomas Show
The Defenders
Dennis the Menace
The Dick Van Dyke Show
The Ed Sullivan Show
Eyewitness
The Garry Moore Show
Gunsmoke
Have Gun – Will Travel
I've Got a Secret
The Jack Benny Show
The Jackie Gleason Show
Lassie
The Lucy-Desi Comedy Hour
The Many Loves of Dobie Gillis
Mister Ed
Perry Mason
Rawhide
The Real McCoys (moved from ABC)
The Red Skelton Show
Route 66
To Tell the Truth
The Twentieth Century
The Twilight Zone
The United States Steel Hour
Walter Cronkite with the News
What's My Line

New Series
The Beverly Hillbillies
Fair Exchange
GE True
The Keefe Brasselle Show *
The Lloyd Bridges Show
The Lucy Show
The New Loretta Young Show
The Nurses
The Real McCoys
Stump the Stars
Vacation Playhouse *

Not returning from 1961–62:
Accent on an American Summer
The Alvin Show
Armstrong Circle Theatre
Checkmate
Douglas Edwards with the News
Father of the Bride
Frontier Circus
Hennesey
Ichabod and Me
The Investigators
Mrs. G. Goes to College/The Gertrude Berg Show
The New Bob Cummings Show
Oh! Those Bells
Pete and Gladys
Tell It to Groucho
Tell It to the Camera
Window on Main Street

NBC

Returning Series
The Art Linkletter Show
The Bell Telephone Hour
Bonanza
Car 54, Where Are You?
David Brinkley's Journal
The Dick Powell Show
Dr. Kildare
The DuPont Show of the Week
Hazel
The Huntley–Brinkley Report
International Showtime
The Joey Bishop Show
Laramie
The Lively Ones
NBC Saturday Night at the Movies
Perry Como's Kraft Music Hall
The Price Is Right
Sing Along with Mitch
Walt Disney's Wonderful World of Color

New Series
The Andy Williams Show
Don't Call Me Charlie!
The Eleventh Hour
Empire
Ensign O'Toole
It's a Man's World
The Jack Paar Program
McKeever and the Colonel
NBC Monday Night at the Movies
Saints and Sinners
Sam Benedict
The Virginian
Wide Country

Not returning from 1961–62:
87th Precinct
The Bob Newhart Show
The Bullwinkle Show
Cain's Hundred
The Detectives Starring Robert Taylor
The Dinah Shore Show
Here and Now
National Velvet
Outlaws
Thriller
Wagon Train (moved to ABC)

Note: The * indicates that the program was introduced in midseason.

References

 Castleman, H. & Podrazik, W. (1982). Watching TV: Four Decades of American Television. New York: McGraw-Hill. 314 pp.
 McNeil, Alex. Total Television. Fourth edition. New York: Penguin Books. .
 Brooks, Tim & Marsh, Earle (2007). The Complete Directory to Prime Time Network and Cable TV Shows (9th ed.). New York: Ballantine. .

United States primetime network television schedules
1962 in American television
1963 in American television